Alan S. Graeff was named chief information officer (CIO) of the National Institutes of Health (NIH) and director of the newly formed Center for Information Technology (CIT) on March 6, 1998.

Personal
As of early 2007, he lived in Bethesda, Maryland with his wife and daughters.  He graduated from American University with a B.S. in distributed sciences.

References

United States Department of Health and Human Services officials
Chief information officers
American University alumni
Living people
Year of birth missing (living people)